Hesketh Bank railway station was a railway station on the West Lancashire Railway (WLR) in North West England, which served the village of Hesketh Bank. The station, originally known as 'Hesketh Bank and Tarleton', opened on 20 February 1878 and was located on the western bank of the River Douglas near a dock where the WLR operated a steamship across the River Ribble to Lytham St Annes. By 1882 the station was referred to as 'Hesketh for Tarleton', but by 1895 the station appears to have been formally renamed to just 'Hesketh Bank'.

The station was originally the northern terminus of what was to be the Southport-Preston Line, running from Hesketh Park on the northern outskirts of Southport; the line through to Preston was opened in September 1888 after the opening of a swing bridge over the Douglas in May of that year. An engine shed was located at the station but closed when the station became a through station, and was demolished by the following year.

As the WLR did not own the land upon which the line was constructed, nor was it acquired by an Act of Parliament, the company had to pay a lease fee (presumably to the local borough council) until 3 September 1881, after the land was vested by Act to the WLR on 3 June 1881.

The station closed on 7 September 1964 as a result of the Beeching axe, the buildings and platforms demolished and the rails removed by February 1965, and the land later developed as a housing estate.

References

External links 
 Hesketh Bank Railway Station & Bridge Photographs accessed 5 March 2007.

Disused railway stations in the Borough of West Lancashire
Former Lancashire and Yorkshire Railway stations
Railway stations in Great Britain opened in 1878
Beeching closures in England
Railway stations in Great Britain closed in 1964